Vidsel Test Range is a Swedish strategic national test and evaluation asset operated by the Swedish Defence Materiel Administration (FMV), a part of the Swedish Ministry of Defence, near Vidsel.

Physical attributes
Vidsel Test Range is located in the north of Sweden, in a region with an extremely low population and little air-traffic.

Restricted airspace
Vidsel Test Range has a permanently restricted airspace, called R02 in the Swedish system.

It covers the suspended ground space and is 7,200 km² in size, with GND/UNL altitude restriction.

Suspended ground-space
Vidsel Test Range has a 3,300 km² large ground area, that is prohibited to enter for non-authorized personnel.

1,600 km² is the original test area established 1958, and is suspended year-around.
1,700 km² (divided in one 1600 km² and one 100 km² part) is only used and suspended when special demands calls for a larger area. The extended range can be used Sept-Jun.

Local impacts
There are uncertainties and critique regarding negative impacts for the local environment and population, including the indigenous population of Sámi people and their herding of reindeers.

See also
Vidsel Air Base
North European Aerospace Test range

References

"Vidsel Range Order", ed 1.1, Swedish Defence Materiel Administration (FMV), 2009
"When the Land Became a Testing Range", Uppsala University

External links
Vidsel Test Range web site
Vidsel Test Range on the Swedish Defence Materiel Administration website

Weapons test sites
Proving grounds
Military installations of Sweden
1958 establishments in Sweden